Events in the year 2018 in Uganda.

Incumbents
 President: Yoweri Museveni
 Vice President: Edward Ssekandi
 Prime Minister: Ruhakana Rugunda

Events

 February - Flood kills at least 45 people.
 

 25 May – Bus accident left 22 people dead and another 15 were injured. 
 

 16 August - Arrest of opposition leader MP Bobi Wine
 11 October - At least 41 people are killed after a river bursts its bank in Bududa, Uganda. Many more are injured and dozens are displaced.

Deaths

5 January – Livingstone Mpalanyi Nkoyoyo, Anglican prelate, Archbishop of Uganda (b. 1938).
8 January – James Makumbi, physician and politician (b. 1942)
1 February – Mowzey Radio, musician (b. 1985)
22 June – Geoffrey Oryema, musician (b. 1953).

References

 
2010s in Uganda 
Years of the 21st century in Uganda 
Uganda 
Uganda